The 1990 Renault Slovenian Open was a professional tennis tournament played on clay courts. It was the 1st edition of the tournament which was part of at time known as ATP Challenger series. It took place in Domžale, Slovenia between 7 and 13 May 1990. It was played at time on the most modern Slovene tennis center and stadium called TEN-TEN in Domžale near Ljubljana. Prize money at time was $50,000.

Singles main-draw entrants

Seeds

 1 Rankings are as of April 30, 1990.

Other entrants
The following players received wildcards into the singles main draw:

  Francesco Cancelloti
  Iztok Božič
  Saša Hiršzon
  Gregor Breznik

The following players received entry from the qualifying draw:
  Nicola Bruno 
  Juan Pino
  Jose Clavet
  Richard Vogel

The following player received entry as a lucky loser:
  Gilbert Schaller

Doubles main-draw entrants

Seeds

1 Rankings as of April 30, 1990.

Other entrants
The following pairs received entry from the qualifying draw:
  Gilbert Schaller /  Andres Võsand

Champions

Singles

 Magnus Larsson def.  Diego Nargiso 7–5, 6–7, 7–6

Doubles

 Carlos Costa /  Francisco Roig def.  Omar Camporese /  Mark Koevermans 6–7, 6–4, 6-4

External links
Official Website

Slovenia
1990 in tennis
1990 in Slovenian tennis
Tennis tournaments in Slovenia
BMW Ljubljana Open